Marina Eduardovna Orgeyeva (born 21 September 1959) is a Russian politician. She is the United Russia MP for the Kaliningrad Central constituency.

She was first elected in the 2021 Russian legislative election.

See also 

 List of members of the 8th Russian State Duma

References 

Living people
1959 births
People from Kaliningrad
Eighth convocation members of the State Duma (Russian Federation)
United Russia politicians
21st-century Russian women politicians
21st-century Russian politicians
Northwestern Management Institute alumni